Emil Johansson (born 11 August 1986) is a Swedish former professional footballer who played as a defender. During his club career he represented Karlskoga SK, Degerfors IF, Hammarby IF, Molde FK, FC Groningen and Sandnes Ulf. A full international between 2010 and 2011, he won two caps for the Sweden national team.

He participated in the 2009 UEFA European Under-21 Football Championship, where he played in all of Sweden's matches and was selected for Goal.com's Team of the Tournament.

References

External links

 

1986 births
Living people
People from Karlskoga Municipality
Swedish footballers
Sweden youth international footballers
Sweden under-21 international footballers
Sweden international footballers
Degerfors IF players
Hammarby Fotboll players
Molde FK players
FC Groningen players
Sandnes Ulf players
Superettan players
Allsvenskan players
Eliteserien players
Eredivisie players
Swedish expatriate footballers
Expatriate footballers in Norway
Swedish expatriate sportspeople in Norway
Expatriate footballers in the Netherlands
Swedish expatriate sportspeople in the Netherlands
Association football defenders
Sportspeople from Örebro County